The Fire Ball is a type of amusement ride manufactured by Larson International. It replaced a series of Larson rides manufactured prior to its unveiling, the first being the Super Loops and the second being the Ring of Fire. The ride features a roller coaster-type train which rolls along a ring-shaped track, turning riders upside down at the top of the loop. Older models of this ride type have trains with each half of the train facing opposite directions, with a protective metal cage and a rigid lap bar restraining the riders. In 1998, Larson introduced a new roofless, open-air train with over-the-shoulder harnesses and seats that sit riders face-to-face with each other. Some owners of the older Ring of Fire rides have had the caged train replaced with the new Fire Ball train.

Though the ride share similarities with that of a roller coaster, notably having a train which rolls along a track, it is often not considered as such since the ride is powered by motorized drive tires, and not by gravity like a roller coaster.

Design
Larson makes three different versions of the ride: The Fire Ball, the 22M Giant Loop, and the Giga Loop 100ft. Each ride provides a similar ride experience, but are larger than each other in terms of both size and capacity.

The ride structure is a large steel boxed-track loop attached to a concrete base or portable trailer with supporting outriggers and steel cables. In this boxed track is a multiple-piece pivoted end-rim (inertia ring) with wheel dogs attached settled within this boxed track. On one section of the rim the train is snugly placed. The rim is run through a shock-absorbent tire drive, which drives the train around the loop.

The ride's train is rocked back and forth at a generous rate, as not to put too much stress on the tire drive. It elevates on every pass through the station until it has gained enough momentum to make it completely around the loop, thus riders experiencing hangtime (the feeling of themselves almost falling out of their seats). Once a number of consecutive loops are made, it can be shifted to go the other direction. It can also be stopped at the top. Since the Super Loop-styled rides are tire-driven, even the slightest water build-up on the rim can cause the drive tires to hydroplane on the rim. This action keeps the ride from completing its loop and can sometimes make a loud squeal. Like many amusement rides, these rides should not be operated during inclement weather such as thunderstorms.

Operation 
Most, if not all, of the Super Loop-styled rides are manually operated with a toggle handle. Most of these rides have a dead man's operator chair that detects the absence of an operator. This prevents the ride from moving in case the handle is bumped without an operator being sat in the chair. Operators of these rides have to be knowledgeable of weight distribution and speed-to-distance ratio. The amount of power needed to operate this ride is 240 volts, 250 amps (60 kW).

These rides have numerous safety features that include:

Emergency power cut-off button.
 Dead-man's operator chair that detects the absence of an operator.
 Anti-air double-lock harnesses with secondary precaution belt that activates when air is released.
 Pull-up-and-move operation toggle that will only move when tip of handle is compressed.

Park installations

References

External links

 at Larson International
Super Loops at Amusement Ride Extravaganza

Amusement rides
Upside-down amusement rides